
Gmina Świerklany is a rural gmina (administrative district) in Rybnik County, Silesian Voivodeship, in southern Poland. Until 1999 its seat was Świerklany Górne.

Villages
Gmina Świerklany contains the villages and settlements of Jankowice Rybnickie, Michałkowice (part of Jankowice Rybnickie), Świerklany Dolne ("Lower Świerklany") and Świerklany Górne ("Upper Świerklany").

Neighbouring gminas
Gmina Świerklany is bordered by the towns of Jastrzębie-Zdrój, Rybnik and Żory, and by the gminas of Marklowice and Mszana.

Twin towns – sister cities

Gmina Świerklany is twinned with:
 Enying, Hungary

References

Swierklany
Rybnik County